The World League for Freedom and Democracy (WLFD) is an international non-governmental organization of anti-communist politicians and groups. It was founded in 1952 as the World Anti-Communist League (WACL) under the initiative of Chiang Kai-shek, leader of the Republic of China (First on Mainland China, after 1949 on Taiwan) and retired General Charles A. Willoughby that united mostly right-wing authoritarian people and organizations, and acted with the support of the right-wing authoritarian regimes of East Asia and Latin America. During the Cold War, WACL actively participated in anti-communist and anti-Soviet positions.

In 1990, the organization changed to its current name, but has preserved its traditions and former ties. It unites representatives from more than 100 countries and has eight regional divisions. It has its headquarters in Taipei, Taiwan.

History
The WLFD descended from the Asian Peoples' Anti-Communist League. Chiang Kai-shek of the Republic of China (ROC) on Taiwan, Elpidio Quirino of the Republic of the Philippines, and Syngman Rhee of the Republic of Korea founded the APACL in Jinhae, the wartime capital city of the Republic of Korea (ROK) on 15 June 1954. Its first general conference was held in that city and was hosted to advocate and support the causes of anti-communism. The other participating states, including South Vietnam, Thailand, Okinawa, Japan, Hong Kong, and Macau also sent representatives.

World Freedom Day

World Freedom Day is a memorial day celebrated on 23 January in Taiwan and South Korea. The event marks the return of some 22,000 ex-communist war prisoners of the Korean War (1950–1953) to Taiwan, of whom 14,000 Chinese soldiers arrived at Keelung harbor on 23 January 1954, and were given the title "Anti-Communist Heroes". The Republic of China (ROC) government subsequently declared 23 January as World Freedom Day to honor these soldiers, and created the "Anti-Communist League" (which later became the World League for Freedom and Democracy) to fight communist expansion worldwide. The league is led by President Yao Eng-Chi, a former Kuomintang-MP and Secretary-General Ger Yeong-Kuang, a Professor of political science at National Taiwan University. Every year World Freedom Day Celebrations are held in Taiwan, and the event is attended by both local and foreign delegates from all over the world. Usually, the president of the ROC delivers congratulations, and cultural events are held.

Asian Pacific League for Freedom and Democracy
The Asian Pacific League for Freedom and Democracy (APLFD) was founded in 1954 as the Asian Peoples' Anti-Communist League in Chinhae, South Korea with the support of the governments of the Philippines, South Korea and Taiwan (as the Republic of China). The APLFD is a non-profit international organization for interchanges among the Asians for peace and prosperity of the region.

The APLFD was founded in the same year and under the same international background as the forming of the South East Asia Treaty Organization (SEATO), or the Manila Pact, did in 1954, when the Second World War was concluded not a long while ago. However, while the SEATO (1954–1977) was sort of an Asian Nato in nature, the APLFD is a people's organization trying to secure peace and prosperity through ideas and convictions and friendship.

Having founded the APACL, the government of the Republic of China prepared to organize the second conference and chose Taipei City as the place to set up the Republic of China Chapter of the APACL on 1 July 1954. Ku Cheng-kang, President of the Chinese Refugees Relief Association of the Republic of China, was designated as the first president of this Chapter. Over the years, successors to the presidency of the Republic of China Chapter are Clement C. P. Chang, Chao Tze-chi, Yao Eng-chi, and Tseng Yung-chuan.  the president was Yao Eng-chi, former Vice President of the ROC Legislative Yuan (Parliament) and also Senior Advisor to the President of the Republic of China on Taiwan.

World Anti-Communist League
In 1966 the memberships of the APACL had increased to 27, in Asia, Australia, and Africa. At its 12th Conference in Seoul on 3 November 1966, a fifteen-member committee was formed to discuss the expansion of this organization. The committee eventually decided to set up a new anti-communist organization, including the APACL, regional organizations, and an international anti-communist organization. On 7 November 1966, the delegates adopted the "Charter of the World Anti-Communist League" at the plenary session. It also resolved that the Republic of China Chapter was in charge of organizing the first General Conference.

The Charter of the World Anti-Communist League (WACL), with 8 chapters and 32 articles, came into effect on 1 April 1967. It stated that the WACL should immediately set up its regional organizations in six regions: Asia (now known as Asian Pacific League for Freedom and Democracy), the Middle East (now known as Middle East Solidarity Council), Africa (now known as the African Organization for Freedom and Democracy), and Europe (now known as the European Council for World Freedom), North America (now known as the North American Federation for Freedom and Democracy), and Latin America (now known as the Federation of Latin American Democratic Organization). The organization in the Asian region was the main force to push for the mission of the World League.

Renaming

To adjust to the worldwide political changes after the dissolution of the Soviet Union and the end of the Cold War and to strive for recruiting more people to join, the WACL held its 22nd General Conference in Brussels, Belgium on 23 July 1990, and the delegates resolved that the organization should be renamed the "World League for Freedom and Democracy" (WLFD). This resolution came into effect on 1 January 1991.

On 21 August 1991, with the new name, the WLFD held its 23rd General Conference in San Jose, Costa Rica. Rafael Ángel Calderón Fournier, President of Costa Rica, and vice presidents from six countries in Latin America, gave speeches. The conference passed a resolution to set up the Presidency of League, a new post to highlight the leading center of the WLFD and also to take responsibility to organize WLFD activities. Chao Tze-chi, President of the Republic of China Chapter of WLFD, was elected as the first President of the WLFD, and re-elected in 1995. U Chae-sung of the ROK was named as the Secretary-General.

On 19 January 2006, the WLFD adopted its charter amendment in the 34th General Conference. According to the Amendment, the President of the League shall be "the top official of the League" and shall represent the League, and shall supervise the performance and development of the League in compliance with the charter. According to the previous charter of the WLFD, the President of the League shall be "the Leader of the League" and shall represent the League. This person shall supervise the performance and development of the League in compliance with the charter.

According to the Charter of the WLFD, the President of the League shall be elected by and from the members of the Executive Board of the League. The result of the election shall be reported to the General Conference. The President shall hold office for a term of four years and shall be eligible for re-election. In October 2000, all members of the Executive Board approved Yao Eng-chi, President of the WLFD ROC Chapter, as the third President of the League during the Executive Board Meeting in New York City The Executive Board also amended the charter to add several positions such as four vice presidents and two deputy secretary-generals. The decision made by the Executive Board was also confirmed by the members at the 31st WLFD General Conference in Taipei, ROC, on 13 January 2001. President Yao Eng-chi was re-elected as President of the League at the 33rd WLFD General Conference in Melbourne, Australia, on 20 December 2003. Ger Yeong-kuang was named as Secretary-General of the League. On 1 August 2008, Ger resigned and was succeeded by Hsieh Wen-huang, Parliamentary Assistant to Vice President Tseng Yung-chuan of the ROC Legislative Yuan (Parliament). Hsieh resigned; Chou Yujen's was nominated to replace him on 23 January 2013.

Membership
According to the charter, national, regional or international organizations that subscribe to the purposes of the League are eligible for membership. Membership shall consist of Regular Members with voting rights and Associate Members without voting rights.

The Asian Pacific League for Freedom and Democracy (APLFD) was formed in 1954 as the Asian Peoples' Anti-Communist League.  The APLFD Secretariat was first established in Saigon, Vietnam in 1957; then the Secretariat moved to Manila in 1964.  Three years later, the Secretariat moved back again to Saigon until its fall in 1975.  After some compromise and a resolution, the APLFD Secretariat was re-established in Taipei, Taiwan in 1976 where it remains active. In 1983, at its conference in Fiji, it changed its name to the Asian Pacific Democratic League.

The APLFD has 18 member nations. It holds an annual conference every year.

The number of members in Denmark is unknown, but several politicians have or have been connected to the organization. Progress Party leader Pia Kjærsgaard participated in 1988 as WACL's guest at the organization's congress in Taipei. The Danish WACL leader has been municipal politician Erik Dissing.

The French chapter was headed by Suzanne Labin. The president of the German section as of 2012 has been Axel Fischer.

In Sweden, a department of WACL was established in 1967. The Swedish organization has been characterized by strong participation among exiled Estonians. Among the member organizations in the late 1960s were Democratic Alliance, Baltic Committee, Nordic War and UN Veterans Association and the Committee for a Free Asia. The National League of Sweden was also linked to the organization for some time. Swedish chairman has been Birger Nerman (1967–70), Arvo Horm (1970–1984), Birger Hagård (1984–88) and Åke J. Ek (1988–2011).

Controversies
In 1978, British anticommunist activist Geoffrey Stewart-Smith, who led the British affiliate out of WACL, declared that despite a publicized housecleaning, "The World Anti-Communist League is largely a collection of Nazis, Fascists, anti-Semites, sellers of forgeries, vicious racialists, and corrupt self-seekers. It has evolved into an anti-Semitic international."

In 1978, Roger Pearson became the World Chairman of the WACL. Pearson was described in a Washington Post article as having neo-Nazi associations and sources report that as a result of an article in The Washington Post in 1978 critical of WACL and alleging extreme right wing politics of Pearson that either he was expelled from WACL or at least was pressured into resigning from his position as World chairman.

The US chapter of WACL, the United States Council for World Freedom (USCWF) was founded in 1981 by Major General John K. Singlaub.  Singlaub was the former US Chief of Staff of both United Nations and American forces in South Korea, but was relieved in 1977 by U.S. President Jimmy Carter after publicly criticizing Carter's decision to reduce the number of troops on the peninsula. Singlaub became a member of the WACL in 1980, and founded and became president of its U.S. chapter, the United States Council for World Freedom.  This branch generated controversy when it supported Nicaraguan guerrillas in the Iran–Contra affair and, in 1981, the USCWF was placed under watch by the Anti-Defamation League, which said that the organization had increasingly become "a point of contact for extremists, racists, and anti-Semites". During the 1980s, the USCWF and WACL conducted a purge of these elements, and invited ADL observers to monitor its conferences; by 1985, the Anti-Defamation League declared itself "satisfied that substantial progress has been made since 1981 in ridding the organization of racists and anti-Semites."

It is alleged that in the mid-1980s WACL had become a supplier of arms to anti-communist rebel movements in southern Africa, Central America, Afghanistan and the Far East. During the 1980s, the WACL was particularly active in Latin America, notably by aiding the Contra forces in Nicaragua. During this period, WACL was criticized for its presence in the organization of neo-Nazis, war criminals, and people linked to death squads and assassinations. Other allegations have included reports claim that the World League for Freedom and Democracy is responsible for producing what its opponents call "troops of killers", while ostensibly organizing to provide support for Corazon Aquino from the right-wing in the Philippines and for supporting the Mozambican National Resistance (RENAMO) movement in Mozambique.

The World Anti-Communist League held annual conferences at various locations throughout the world.  Numerous groups participated, including the Unification Church of the Rev. Sun Myung Moon. WACL also enjoyed support from many U.S. Congressmen, most notably 2008 presidential nominee Senator John McCain (R-AZ), who sat on the United States Council for World Freedom (USCWF) Board of Directors in the early 1980s. When his membership was brought up during the election McCain said he resigned from the council in 1984 and asked in 1986 to have his name removed from the group's letterhead but there was absolutely no evidence that McCain had ever resigned or asked for his name's removal from the United States Council for World Freedom.

Controversial participants of WACL conferences
In the World Anti-Communist League, numerous Nazi collaborators and Latin American death squads were active. The prominent individuals who attended conferences included:
Ryōichi Sasakawa, gangster and billionaire jailed as a war criminal after World War II
 Reverend Sun Myung Moon, head of the Unification Church (Moon sect)
Yoshio Kodama, behind-the-scenes power broker and Yakuza crime lord from Japan
Osami Kuboki, member of the Moon sect, president of the  International Federation for Victory over Communism (IFVC) and the Japanese Unification Church 
Mario Sandoval Alarcón, Guatemalan politician, “Godfather” of Central American death squads
Giorgio Almirante, founder and leader of neo-fascist Italian Social Movement
Dsmitryj Kasmowitsch, the Belarusian policeman of Smolensk, who was responsible for fighting partisans
Theodor Oberländer, Nazi German politician in the NSDAP, participant in the Beer Hall Putsch, Oberleutnant of the Nachtigall Battalion
Ante Pavelić, Croatian Ustaše fascist leader of the Independent State of Croatia, responsible for the genocide of Serbs during World War II
Otto Skorzeny, Austrian Nazi German SS-Obersturmbannführer
Alfredo Stroessner, dictator of Paraguay

See also 
 American Security Council
Anti-Bolshevik Bloc of Nations
 Australian League of Rights
 British League of Rights
 Croatian Liberation Movement
 Le Cercle
 Western Goals Institute
 Western Goals Foundation

References

Further reading
Books
Anderson, Scott & Jon Lee. Inside The League: The Shocking Expose of How Terrorists, Nazis, and Latin American Death Squads Have Infiltrated the World Anti-Communist League. New York: Dodd, Mead, 1986. 
Rodríguez Jiménez, José Luis. Reaccionarios y Golpistas: La Extrema Derecha en España: Del Tardofranquismo a la consolidación de la Democracia, 1967–1982. CSIC Press, 1994. 

Articles
Scott, Peter Dale. "Contragate: Reagan, Foreign Money, and the Contra Deal." Crime and Social Justice, No. 27/28, Contragate and Counter Terrorism: A Global Perspective, 1987, pp. 110–148.
"Gæst hos fascismen." Det fri Aktuelt, 18 September 1988. Archived link.
Gülstorff, Torben. Warming Up a Cooling War: An Introductory Guide on the CIAS and Other Globally Operating Anti-communist Networks at the Beginning of the Cold War Decade of Détente (Cold War International History Project Working Paper Series #75). Washington 2015.
"President Ma attends 2011 World Freedom Day Celebration and WLFD, APLFD General Conference." Office of the President, Republic of China.
"President hopes to include human rights in Taiwan-China dialogue." Focus Taiwan.
Advocates of Freedom and Democracy Gather in Songdo, Incheon." Korea Times.
Contra: Frågor och svar
Rightweb.IRC-Online.org Archived link.

External links

44th Conference, December 17 – 20, 1998, Manila, Philippines
Who's who: Yao Eng-Chi
2009 World Freedom Day Celebrations in Taipei 
2013 World Freedom Day Ceremonies in Taipei

Chiang Kai-shek
Anti-communist organizations
International political organizations
Organizations established in 1966
1966 establishments in Taiwan
Organizations based in Taipei
International organizations based in Taiwan
Foreign relations of Taiwan
Public holidays in Taiwan
January observances
South Korea–Taiwan relations
Far-right politics